Brown's Arcade is a historic retail and office building located at Baltimore, Maryland, United States. It consists of four early 19th century brick rowhouses. Architect Henry F. Brauns redesigned a row of four, three story buildings in 1904 into the original Brown's Arcade, with the application of Colonial Revival details over the original Federal-style façade. It was converted to a series of small shops; bordering a straight central walkway with offices above.  The rear courtyard contains two-story brick structures with shed roofs and a two-story Renaissance Revival style structure.

Brown's Arcade was listed on the National Register of Historic Places in 1983.

References

External links
, including photo from 1984, at Maryland Historical Trust
The Historical Marker Database

Buildings and structures in Baltimore
Commercial buildings on the National Register of Historic Places in Baltimore
Commercial buildings completed in 1904
Colonial Revival architecture in Maryland
Downtown Baltimore